The 2002–03 Botola is the 47th season of the Moroccan Premier League. Hassania Agadir are the holders of the title.

Teams

 CODM Meknès
 Hassania Agadir
 Raja Casablanca
 Wydad Casablanca
 Maghreb Fez
 Jeunesse Massira
 SCCM Mohammédia
 Olympique Khouribga
 RS Settat
 FAR Rabat
 IZK Khemisset
 TS Casablanca
 IR Tanger
 FUS Rabat
 KAC Kenitra
 Kawkab Marrakech

Final league table

Statistics

Top Scorer : 14 goals scored by Mustapha Bidoudane - Raja Casablanca
Best Attack : 36 goals scored by Raja Casablanca
Best Defense : 12 goals conceded by Hassania Agadir
Drawn Matches : 190

External links
RSSSF competition overview

Botola seasons
Morocco
1